S. Holton Farm is a historic home located near Middletown, New Castle County, Delaware.  It was built about 1850, and is a three-story ell-shaped frame dwelling with a two-story rear ell in the Greek Revival idiom and Georgian "I"-form. It has a five bay front facade, and shallow-pitched hipped roof with two square brick chimneys.  Also on the property are a contributing granary and two milkhouses.

It was listed on the National Register of Historic Places in 1985.

References

Houses completed in 1850
Houses on the National Register of Historic Places in Delaware
Georgian architecture in Delaware
Greek Revival houses in Delaware
Houses in New Castle County, Delaware
National Register of Historic Places in New Castle County, Delaware